Llyn Aled is a lake on Mynydd Hiraethog in the Conwy County Borough. It is a natural lake; however, a dam was built at its northern outlet to increase its size. One can reach the lake via the A543. There are a number of varieties of fish in the lake, including pike. The lake was used by the Llyn Aled Sailing Club (Clwb Hwylio Llyn Aled), but the club closed down due to a dwindling membership and the proximity of the much larger Llyn Brenig.

The Clwydian Way runs along the north side of the lake.

Llyn Aled feeds the Llyn Aled Isaf reservoir. The lake is also the source of the River Aled, which flows northward.

References 

Aled
Llansannan